The Balliol-Trinity Laboratories in Oxford, England, was an early chemistry laboratory at the University of Oxford.
The laboratory was located between Balliol College and Trinity College, hence the name. It was especially known for physical chemistry.

Chemistry was first recognized as a separate discipline at Oxford University in the 19th century. From 1855, a chemistry laboratory existed in a basement at Balliol College. In 1879, Balliol and Trinity agreed to have a laboratory at the boundary of the two colleges. The laboratory became the strongest of the Oxford college research institutions in chemistry. It remained in operation until the Second World War when a new Physical Chemistry Laboratory (PCL) was constructed by Oxford University in the Science Area.

People
The following scientists of note worked in the Balliol-Trinity Laboratories:

 E. J. Bowen
 Sir John Conroy
 Sir Harold Hartley
 Sir Cyril Norman Hinshelwood (Nobel Prize winner)
 Henry Moseley

See also
 Abbot's Kitchen, Oxford, another early chemistry laboratory in Oxford
 Department of Chemistry, University of Oxford
 Physical Chemistry Laboratory, which replaced the Balliol-Trinity Laboratories

References

1879 establishments in England
1940 disestablishments in England
Buildings and structures completed in 1879
Buildings and structures of the University of Oxford
History of the University of Oxford
University and college laboratories in the United Kingdom
Chemistry laboratories
Demolished buildings and structures in England
Balliol College, Oxford
Trinity College, Oxford
Physical chemistry